SWM may refer to:
 swm or Selbourne Window Manager, a free X Window manager
 SWM (motorcycles) or Speedy Working Motors, a manufacturer of off-road motorcycles in the 1970s and 1980s
 SWM (automobiles) Speedy Working Motors automotive brand established in 2016
 Stanford Watershed Model, a hydrology transport model
 South Wales Metro, a proposed train network across South Wales
 Stadtwerke München (SWM), German communal company, owned by the city of Munich
 Swanscombe railway station, Kent, England (National Rail station code)